Subkhankulovo (Sobxanğol) is a rural locality (a selo) and the administrative centre of Subkhankulovsky Selsoviet, Tuymazinsky District, Bashkortostan, Russia. The population was 5,598 as of 2010. There are 20 streets.

Geography 
Subkhankulovo is located 11 km southeast of Tuymazy (the district's administrative centre) by road. Staroye Subkhankulovo is the nearest rural locality.

References 

Rural localities in Tuymazinsky District